is a Japanese actress and model best known for playing the role of Kaoru Shiba in the TV show Samurai Sentai Shinkenger.

Filmography

 Watashi ga Kodomo datta Koro (NHK-BShi, 2007) as Eriko Furuhashi
 Otoko no Kosodate (TV Asahi, 2007) as Rinko Yano
 Seigi no Mikata (Nippon TV, 2008, Episodes 1 - 3) as Makiko Nakata (Young)
 Samurai Sentai Shinkenger (TV Asahi, 2009 - 2010) as Kaoru Shiba
 Kaizoku Sentai Gokaiger (TV Asahi, 2011 - 2012, Episodes 11 & 12) as Kaoru Shiba
 Don Quixote (NTV, 2011, Episode 8) as Takako Iwakura (Young)
 Kamen Rider Fourze (TV Asahi, 2011 - 2012, Episodes 30 - 32) as Mei Shirakawa
 Radio (NHK, 2013) as Emi Okazaki
 Kaigo Helper Shiuko no Jikenbo 2 (TV Tokyo, 2013) as Aya Narita
 Yo ni mo Kimyō na Monogatari: Spring 2014 Special (Fuji TV, 2014) as Student
 Tenshi no Knife (Wowow, 2015) as Yuri Katō
 Kamen Rider Ex-Aid (TV Asahi, 2016 - 2017, Episode 4) as Riko Nishiwaki

Films
 Buta ga Ita Kyōshitsu (2008) as Runa Nanami
 Tensou Sentai Goseiger vs. Shinkenger: Epic on Ginmaku (2011) as Kaoru Shiba
 Utopia Sounds (2012)
 Aku no Kyōten (2012) as Fuuko Onodera
 Tokumei Sentai Go-Busters vs. Kaizoku Sentai Gokaiger: The Movie (2013) as Kaoru Shiba
 Kotodama – Spiritual Curse (2014) as Miharu
 Death Forest 3 (2015) as Hiroko Tagami

References

1995 births
Living people
Japanese female models
Japanese child actresses
Place of birth missing (living people)
Former Stardust Promotion artists
Models from Tokyo Metropolis